Claud W. Somers  is a Chesapeake Bay skipjack, built in 1911 in Young's Creek, Virginia, by W. Thomas Young of Parksley, who also built Bernice J..  She is ported at the Reedville Fisherman's Museum in Reedville, Virginia. In 1977 Claude W. Somers was struck by a squall near Hooper Strait Light, leaving six drowned, including her owner-captain.

She was listed on the National Register of Historic Places in Maryland in 1985 and in Virginia in 2005. She is an exhibit at the Reedville Fishermen's Museum in Reedville, Virginia. She is assigned Maryland dredge number 55.

References

External links
 Claud W. Somers at the Reedville Fishermen's Museum

Skipjacks
Ships on the National Register of Historic Places in Maryland
1911 ships
Ships on the National Register of Historic Places in Virginia
National Register of Historic Places in Northumberland County, Virginia
Maritime incidents in 1977